A film sculptor is employed within the art department of a feature film.

Their skills are and can be used to create any number of different things from giant rocks in a landscape or oversized stone blocks cladding the facade of a castle to statuary and ornate panelling, to more specialized pieces such as a vehicle hull for a fantasy film used in set construction.  The material often utilised for large-scale rocks or columns is polystyrene because it is light and can be carved easily using a hot wire.  Polystyrene can also be used to sculpt mid-sized items that are difficult to build in wood and too large for clay - an item such as a moulded chair can then be cast with plaster and reproduced in fibre-glass. Clay modelling is still preferable for any item needing detail and is always used for smaller and finer work.

Film sculptors
 Keith Short
 John Blakeley
 Sam Demke

References
https://www.imdb.com/name/nm1548800/?ref_=fn_al_nm_1

External links
wordpress.com, Production Team & Crew Glossary

Filmmaking occupations